Richard Carey may refer to:

 Richard Carey (judge) (died 1789), judge in Virginia
 Richard Carey (politician) (1929–2013), American politician from Maine
 Richard Carey (American football) (born 1968), former American football defensive back
 Richard Adams Carey, American writer
 Rick Carey (born 1963), American swimmer
 Richard Carey, American thrash metal musician for the band RUIN (band)